Tanya Selvaratnam (born ) is an American producer and a writer. In January 2014, Prometheus Books published her book, The Big Lie: Motherhood, Feminism, and the Reality of the Biological Clock, to critical acclaim. With Laurie Anderson and Laura Michalchyshyn, she is the cofounder of The Federation, a coalition of artists, organizations, and allies committed to promoting art as a tool of intercultural communication and tolerance.

Early life
Selvaratnam was born in Colombo, Sri Lanka, and was raised in Long Beach, California. Selvaratnam now lives in New York City and Portland, Oregon. Selvaratnam's career in the arts and social justice began with her work assisting Anna Deavere Smith on the development of Twilight: Los Angeles, 1992|Twilight: Los Angeles, (1992) about the human toll of the L.A. riots, and with her position as a youth organizer on the steering committee of the NGO Forum/Fourth World Conference on Women in China in 1995. She then was the Special Projects Coordinator at the Ms. Foundation for Women until 1998. In addition, she was an organizer and researcher for the World Health Organization’s Kobe Conference on Women and Tobacco in 1999.

Education
Selvaratnam attended high school at Phillips Academy Andover. She received her B.A. in East Asian Languages and Civilizations and her M.A. in Regional Studies – East Asia from Harvard University. Her master's thesis on the interplay of law and practice with regard to women's rights in China was published in the Journal of Law and Politics.

Career
Selvaratnam is the Senior Advisor, Gender Justice Narratives, for the Pop Culture Collaborative and the author of numerous essays and two books: Assume Nothing: A Story of Intimate Violence (Harper) and The Big Lie (Prometheus). Assume Nothing has been optioned by ABC Signature/Disney Television Studios and is in development with Joanna Coles as executive producer.

With the artist Laurie Anderson and the producer Laura Michalchyshyn, Selvaratnam is a co-founder of The Federation: a coalition of artists, organizations, and allies committed to keeping cultural borders open and showing how art unites us. She has also been an advisor and producer for For Freedoms, which catalyzes public discourse and civic engagement through the arts; specifically, she worked on the organization’s 50 State Initiative as well as the For Freedoms Congress.

Selvaratnam produced for The Vision & Justice Project, founded by Professor Sarah Lewis (Harvard University); Glamour Women of the Year; The Meteor;  Joy To The Polls; Invisible Hand; The Shed multi-arts center; and Planned Parenthood. Since 2007, she has been a producer with Aubin Pictures, founded by Catherine Gund; Aubin’s latest film is AGGIE about collector and philanthropist Agnes Gund who created the Art for Justice Fund to fight mass incarceration. For nine years, Selvaratnam was the Communications and Special Projects Officer for the Rubell Family Collection/Contemporary Arts Foundation, based in Miami, Florida. In 2020, she was a volunteer for the Biden-Harris Policy Committee and also served as Content Chair of Arts for Biden-Harris.

Selvaratnam’s producing range includes films, branded content, live events, large-scale convenings, and exhibitions. She has produced work by Gabri Christa, Lisa Cortés, Shruti Ganguly, Liz Garbus, Catherine Gund, Tiffany Shlain, Mickalene Thomas, Lucy Walker, Carrie Mae Weems, and Jed Weintrob, among others. Her films have played on HBO, IFC, PBS, Showtime, Starz, Refinery29, Vice, and the Sundance Channel; and have premiered at Sundance, Berlin, Tribeca, and SXSW. Selvaratnam has worked on live events at the Guggenheim Museum, the Hammer Museum, Kennedy Center, The Kitchen, MOCA Los Angeles, Park Avenue Armory, Performance Space New York, and Rubell Family Collection.

As a performer, Selvaratnam has toured to dozens of cities with companies including The Wooster Group and The Builders Association; and has been a guest actor at New Dramatists, Lincoln Center Directors Lab, Voice & Vision Theater, and the Institute on Arts and Civic Dialogue. She has played on stages at prestigious venues around the world, such as New York’s Brooklyn Academy of Music and Lincoln Center, London’s Barbican Theatre, and Singapore’s Victoria Theatre.

Personal life 
From 2016 to 2017, Selvaratnam was in a relationship with New York Attorney General Eric Schneiderman who she first met at the 2016 Democratic National Convention. In May 2018, Selvaratnam and other women came forward alleging abuse by Schneiderman which was reported by The New Yorker. Three hours after publication of the allegations, Schneiderman resigned from his office. Selvaratnam recounts her experience in her book, Assume Nothing.

Bibliography

Books 
The Big Lie (2014)
Assume Nothing (2020)

Filmography 
 On_Line (2002)
 Domino (2003)
 The F Word (2005)
 Our City Dreams (2008)
 What's On Your Plate? (2009)
 MADE HERE (2009–2013)
 Beginnings (2010)
 Happy Birthday to a Beautiful Woman (2013)
 Born to Fly (2014)
 It's Not Okay (2016)
 Stand Up For Us (2017)
 Prepare to March (2017) 
 Chavela (2017)
 UNSTOPPABLE (for Planned Parenthood) (2018)
 GLAMOUR Women of the Year (2017-ongoing)
AGGIE (2020)
SURGE (2020)

References

External links
 

1971 births
21st-century American non-fiction writers
21st-century American women
Activists from New York City
American feminist writers
American people of Sri Lankan Tamil descent
American social justice activists
American women memoirists
American women non-fiction writers
American women television producers
American women writers of Asian descent
American writers of Sri Lankan descent
Harvard University alumni
Living people
People from Long Beach, California
Phillips Academy alumni
Writers from New York City